Black Journal may refer to:
Black Journal - film
Black Journal (television)